Samuel A. Carlson (1868–1961) was mayor of Jamestown, New York. He is famous for bringing the Jamestown Board of Public Utilities (BPU) to life. Carlson was the sixth Mayor (1908–1928) and the eighth Mayor (1930–1934) of the town. Mayor Carlson was a Republican and a native of Jamestown, New York. Jamestown dedicated a historical marker to him on the grounds of Jamestown City Hall. The BPU named the Samuel A. Carlson Electric Generating Station, a municipal coal-fired power plant in Jamestown, after him. Carlson holds the longest term ever served by any Mayor of Jamestown with a total of 24 years in City Hall.

In addition to his connection to the BPU, Carlson was an initiator and supporter of Jamestown's public hospital, public market, parks, roads and bridges, non-partisan elections, and new city charter. He also drilled the first water well to create the city's public water system. He was twice president of the New York State Conference of Mayors.

References

1868 births
1961 deaths
Politicians from Jamestown, New York
Mayors of places in New York (state)